William Houison Craufurd sometimes spelled William Howieson Craufurd (29 November 1781 – 17 September 1871) was a landed country gentleman. He was a Deputy-Lieutenant of the County of Ayr, Justice of the Peace, and Commissioner of Supply. After several years as an elder in the Church of Scotland, he left at the Disruption and joined the Free Church of Scotland. He was photographed by Hill & Adamson, pioneering photographers, who recorded many Free Church ministers and leaders.

Ancestry, early life and training

William Houison-Craufurd of Craufurdland and Braehead, was born on 29 November 1781. His father was James Moody, a Church of Scotland minister. James came to the West Church, Perth on 11 June 1772. James Moody assumed the name of Howison Craufurd in consequence of his succession by marriage to the estate of Craufurdland, by decision of the House of Lords on 14 March 1806. He subsequently demitted his post on 2 December 1807. William's mother was Elizabeth, the eldest daughter of John Howison and heiress of Braehead, Cramond. William Houison Craufurd was educated at the High School of Edinburgh, from which he passed to the university.

Political life and offices
In  all  public  matters  Mr  Craufurd  took  a  great  and  active  interest.  He was  a  Deputy-Lieutenant  of  the  County  of  Ayr,  Justice  of  the  Peace,  and  Commissioner  of  Supply.  All  through  life  he  was  a  keen  politician,  thoroughly  Conservative,  while  the  progress  of  events  somewhat  modified  his  views,  he  retained  his  political  opinions  to  the  end.

Work as a Church of Scotland elder
Craufurd  occupied  the  chair  at  Bible  Society and  missionary  meetings  in  Edinburgh,  and  joined  with  Dr  Andrew  Thomson  in  the  defence  of  pure  Bible  circulation. As  an  elder  of  the  church,  he  sat  for  nearly  sixty  years  in  the  General Assembly,  and  although  his  voice  was  seldom  heard  in  the  discussions,  his  influence  and  vote  were  consistent.

At the Disruption
In  everything  connected  with  the  congregation  he  took  the  deepest  interest.

Later  in  life  he  was  requested  by  his  numerous  friends  to  sit  for  his  portrait, was  hung  in  Craufurdland Castle.  The  Presbytery  of  Irvine,  whose  representative  in  the  General  Assembly  he  had  been  for  fifty  years,  invited  him  to  a  public  entertainment  to  celebrate  his  official  jubilee.

Royal tradition
The  Howisons  possessed  Braehead  in  Mid  Lothian  since  the  reign  of  James  the  First. This  service  was  performed by  Mr.  Howison-Crawfurd,  then  younger  of  Crawfurdland,  in  right  of  the  lairdship  of  Braehead,  to  King  George  the  Forth,  at  the  banquet  given  to  his  majesty  by  the  city  of  Edinburgh,  24  August 1822,  when  he  was  attended  by  masters  Charles  and  Walter  Scott,  the  one  a  son,  the  other  a  nephew  of  the  author  of  Waverley,  as  pages,  attired  in  splendid  dresses  of  scarlet  and  white  satin. The  rose-water  then  used  has  ever  since  been  hermetically  sealed  up,  and  the  towel  which  dried  the  hands  of  his  majesty  on  that  occasion  has  never  been  used  for  any  other  purpose.

Death
He died on 17 September 1871. He was buried on 23 September 1871 at the family burial ground at Fenwick Parish Church.

Family
He married on 14 June 1808, Jane Esther, only daughter of James Whyte, Esq. of Newmains, by his wife, Esther Craufurd, with issue. She collected manuscripts including one of 'Epitaph' on Grizzel Grim by Robert Burns.

References

Citations

Sources

1781 births
1871 deaths
19th-century Scottish landowners
Free Church of Scotland people